Marcus "Soup" Harris (born March 1, 1989) is a former American football wide receiver. He played college football at Murray State University. He has also been a member of the Detroit Lions, Tennessee Titans, Omaha Nighthawks, Iowa Barnstormers, New York Giants, and Baltimore Brigade.

Early years
Harris played quarterback for Kirkwood High School in Kirkwood, Missouri. He earned second-team all-state honors after passing for 1,800 yards and rushing for 450 yards his senior year. He also led the Pioneers to the class 5A state championship game, where they lost to Raymore-Peculiar High School. He was named first-team all-conference his junior and senior seasons. Harris was named honorable mention all-state after his junior year in which he threw for 2,423 yards.

College career
Harris played football from 2007 to 2010 with the Murray State Racers. He finished his college career with 217 receptions, 2,479 receiving yards and 21 receiving touchdowns.

Professional career

Detroit Lions
Harris was signed by the Detroit Lions on July 28, 2011 after going undrafted in the 2011 NFL Draft. He was released by the Lions on August 29, 2011. He was signed to the Lions' practice squad on November 30, 2011. Harris was signed to a reserve/futures contract by the Lions on January 10, 2012.

Tennessee Titans
Harris signed with the Tennessee Titans on August 1, 2012. He was released by the Titans on August 26, 2012.

Omaha Nighthawks
Harris spent the 2012 season with the Omaha Nighthawks of the United Football League.

Iowa Barnstormers
Harris was signed by the Iowa Barnstormers on February 27, 2013. He accrued 94 receptions, 1,223 receiving yards, and 19 touchdowns during the 2013 Arena Football League season.

New York Giants
Harris signed with the New York Giants on August 12, 2013. He was released by the Giants on August 31 and re-signed to the Giants' practice squad on September 1, 2013. He was released by the Giants on September 24, 2013 and re-signed to the team's practice squad on October 1, 2013. Harris was placed on injured reserve on August 26, 2014. He was released by the Giants on July 15, 2015 and placed on injured reserve on July 16, 2015. He became a free agent on March 9, 2016.

Baltimore Brigade
Harris was assigned to the Baltimore Brigade on January 18, 2017.

References

External links
Just Sports Stats
NFL Draft Scout
Arena Football League profile

Living people
1989 births
African-American players of American football
American football wide receivers
Murray State Racers football players
Omaha Nighthawks players
Iowa Barnstormers players
New York Giants players
Baltimore Brigade players
Players of American football from St. Louis
21st-century African-American sportspeople
20th-century African-American people